Urodacidae is a family containing two genera of scorpions, both of which are endemic to Australia. It was first described by British zoologist Reginald Innes Pocock in 1893. Formerly a subfamily (Urodacinae) of the Scorpionidae, it was later raised to family rank. Its sister taxon is the monotypic family Heteroscorpionidae, the species of which are confined to Madagascar.

Genera
 Aops Volschenk & Prendini, 2008 - (1 sp.)
 Urodacus Peters, 1861 - (21 spp.)

References

 

 
 
Scorpion families
Taxa named by R. I. Pocock
Endemic fauna of Australia
Scorpions of Australia